Abubakar Nur Abdikarim (born 13 May 1992) is a Somali former footballer.

Career statistics

International

References

1992 births
Living people
Association football defenders
Somalian footballers
Somalia international footballers
Place of birth missing (living people)